John Bighead (April 23, 1930 – April 28, 1993) was an American football player. A Yuchi Indian, he starred in football at L.A. Poly High in the 1940s and played in the National Football League (NFL).  He was a 1948 graduate of Pepperdine University after earning Little All-American honors in football and track.

After serving in the United States Navy, he played two years in the NFL.  He was drafted in the 15th round of the 1952 NFL draft by the Dallas Texans in 1952.  Jack Bighead then played professionally for the Baltimore Colts in 1954 and the Los Angeles Rams in 1955. He was the starter for the Rams before a career-ending leg injury. He played one season in the CFL with the Hamilton Tiger-Cats in 1956 too.

He joined the teaching staff of the Anaheim Union High School District in 1957, teaching and coaching at Western and Magnolia where he was also known to always be carrying a clipboard as his character "Little Boy" did in the 1951 movie Jim Thorpe – All-American. He joined the Katella faculty when it opened in 1966 and coached track and taught health before retiring in 1987. After retiring from teaching at Katella high School, the school name an annual track and field event in his honor. He was married to Joan Bighead, and they had two kids (Jacqueline, and Diane), three grandchildren (Casey, Jackson, and Tanner), and three great-grandchildren (Rory, Vanessa, and Kota).

References

External links
 
 

1930 births
1993 deaths
American football ends
Hamilton Tiger-Cats players
Baltimore Colts players
Los Angeles Rams players
Pepperdine Waves football players
Pepperdine Waves men's track and field athletes
Players of American football from Los Angeles
People from Sapulpa, Oklahoma
Players of American football from Oklahoma
Native American players of American football